Hek (also known as Haik, Hech, and Hīk) is a village in Mehrabad Rural District, Bahman District, Abarkuh County, Yazd Province, Iran. At the 2006 census, its population was 145, in 43 families.

References 

Populated places in Abarkuh County